Zane Smith may refer to:

 Zane Smith (baseball) (born 1960), American baseball player
 Zane Smith (racing driver) (born 1999), American stock car racing driver